Hypanthidium is a genus of bees belonging to the family Megachilidae.

The species of this genus are found in Southern America.

Species:

Hypanthidium beniense 
Hypanthidium buchwaldi 
Hypanthidium cacerense 
Hypanthidium costaricense 
Hypanthidium dentiventre 
Hypanthidium divaricatum 
Hypanthidium dressleri 
Hypanthidium duckei 
Hypanthidium ecuadorium 
Hypanthidium fabricianum 
Hypanthidium foveolatum 
Hypanthidium magdalenae 
Hypanthidium maranhense 
Hypanthidium melanopterum 
Hypanthidium mexicanum 
Hypanthidium nigritulum 
Hypanthidium obscurius 
Hypanthidium taboganum 
Hypanthidium tuberigaster 
Hypanthidium yucatanicum

References

Apidae